Dunfermline West may mean or refer to:

 Dunfermline West (UK Parliament constituency)
 Dunfermline West (Scottish Parliament constituency)